Seventh Edition may refer to:

 7th Edition (Magic: The Gathering), playing cards
 Version 7 Unix, operating system